Asamannoor is a village in the Ernakulam district of Kerala, India. It is located in the Kunnathunad taluk.

History
It came into existence in 1953 with six wards and seven ward members. Besides the general seat, the first ward was having a reserved seat also. Its duration was three years. The first president was K. Keshavappisharadi (two years) and then S.N. Nair. Since 1957 administrator rule is in operation.

Demographics 

According to the 2011 census of India, Asamannoor has 4714 households. The literacy rate of the village is 84.57%.

References 

Villages in Kunnathunad taluk